Yodwicha Porboonsit (born April 18, 1996), also known as Yodwicha Por Boonsit, is a Thai Muay Thai kickboxer, originally from Nakhon Ratchasima, but now fighting out of Bangkok, Thailand. He is a former 130 lbs. champion of Lumpinee Stadium and 135 lbs. champion of Thailand. He is the reigning WBC Muaythai Super Welterweight champion.

He holds notable wins over Saenchai PKSaenchaimuaythaigym, Singdam Kiatmuu9, Nong-O Kaiyanghadaogym and Petchboonchu FA Group.

Career
On 29 March 2012 he was named the Sportswriters of Thailand boxer of the year, an award he shared with fellow teenager Sangmanee Sor Tienpo.

He defeated legend Saenchai PKSaenchaimuaythaigym on points at Lumpinee on May 10, 2013. The pair were set to rematch on June 7, 2013 but a lingering neck injury forced Saenchai out of the bout.

He beat Wanchalerm Aodoonmuang by decision at Lumpinee on July 16, 2013 in the second defence of his lightweight title.

He beat Singdam Kiatmoo9 on points in a rematch at Rajadamnern on August 8, 2013.

On January 7, 2014 he won the Thai Light Welterweight title, beating Chamuaktong Sor Yupinda by decision.

On February 7, 2014 Yodwicha was supposed to fight Chamuaktong Sor Yupinda again, this time for the Light Welterweight title Thailand and the Light Welterweight Lumpinee title, but failed to make weight.

In 2014, Yodwicha fought Petchboonchu FA Group five times in a row. He lost the first and third fight and the fighters tied the second fight, while Yodwicha won the fourth and fifth fight. Yodwicha had already beaten Petboonchu twice in earlier fights, taking his record up to 4-2-1 against Petboonchu.

On August 4, 2015, Yodwicha fought his first fight in Europe. He fought Frenchman Jimmy Vienot in Saint Tropez, France and won by decision after five rounds.

After a surprise defeat at the hands of Ritthevada Sittikul, Yodwicha bounced back by besting Bobo Sacko in his second fight in Europe on the 13th of December, winning the match by decision after 5 rounds.

Yodwicha took on Zhao Yan on the 5th of March at the Wu Lin Feng World Championship 2016 event in Zhengzhou, China. The fight was held at 71 kg and Yodwicha won by decision.

After suffering another 5 round decision loss at the hands of Ritthevada in Bangkok, Yodwicha headed back to France to take on Jimmy Vienot in a rematch. The result was a repetition of their first fight, as Yodwicha took the decision after 5 rounds. Yodwicha would then travel to China to take on  Englishman Brad Stanton and Belarusian Dmitry Varets at Top King World Series 9 and 10, respectively. He beat both fighters by decision.

Yodwicha is expected to fight Dzianis Zuev at Kunlun Fight 62 on June 10, 2017 in Bangkok, Thailand.

On February 23, 2020, Yodwicha defeated Satanfah Rachanon by second-round knockout to win the WBC Muaythai Super Welterweight Champion.

On July 4, 2021, Yodwicha defeated Braian Allevato by first-round technical knockout at THAI FIGHT Strong.

Yodwicha was scheduled to challenge Jimmy Vienot for the WMC Middleweight Championship at Empire Fight: Vikings Edition on October 2, 2021. He lost by controversial decision.

On September 9, 2022, Yodwicha faced the reigning Rajadamnern Stadium super welterweight champion Daniel Rodriguez in the second round of the Rajadamnern World Series group phase. He lost the fight by split decision.

Titles
Omnoi Stadium
2012 Omnoi Stadium Featherweight 126 lbs/57 kg champion
Lumpinee Stadium
2012 Lumpinee Stadium Super featherweight 130 lbs/59 kg champion
Sports Writers Association of Thailand
2012 Sports Writers Association of Thailand Fighter of the Year (shared with Sangmanee Sor.Tienpo)
Professional Boxing Association of Thailand (PAT)
2013 Thailand Lightweight 135 lbs/61 kg champion
2014 Thailand Light Welterweight 140 lbs/63.5 kg champion
Topking World Series
2016 Topking World Series 154 lbs/70 kg Tournament Champion
Army Games
2018 Army Games -71 kg Tournament Champion
WBC Muay Thai
2020 WBC Muay Thai World Super Welterweight 154 lbs/70 kg Champion

Fight record

|- style="background:#fbb" 
| 2022-12-23|| Loss ||align="left" | Daniel Rodriguez  || Rajadamnern World Series - Final|| Bangkok, Thailand || Decision (Split) ||5 ||3:00 
|-
! style=background:white colspan=9 |

|- style="background:#cfc" 
| 2022-11-18 || Win ||align="left" | Luis Cajaiba || Rajadamnern World Series - Semi Final|| Bangkok, Thailand || Decision (Unanimous) || 3 || 3:00

|- style="background:#cfc" 
| 2022-10-14 || Win ||align="left" | Rungrat Pumphanmuang || Rajadamnern World Series - Group Stage|| Bangkok, Thailand || TKO (Knees) || 1 ||

|- style="background:#fbb" 
| 2022-09-09 || Loss ||align="left" | Daniel Rodriguez || Rajadamnern World Series - Group Stage || Bangkok, Thailand || Decision (Split) ||3  ||3:00 
|- style="background:#cfc;"
| 2022-08-05 || Win ||align=left| Tyler Hardcastle || Rajadamnern World Series - Group Stage|| Bangkok, Thailand || KO (Elbow)|| 1||0:40
|- style="background:#cfc;"
| 2021-12-05 || Win ||align=left| Omar Samb || Muay Thai Grand Prix France || Paris, France || Decision || 5 || 3:00
|-
|- style="background:#fbb;"
|  2021-10-02 || Loss || align="left" | Jimmy Vienot || Empire Fight - Vikings Edition || Montbéliard, France || Decision (Split) || 5 || 3:00
|-
! style=background:white colspan=9 |
|- style="background:#cfc;"
| 2021-07-04 ||Win||align=left| Braian Allevato || THAI FIGHT Strong || Pattaya, Thailand || TKO (3 Knockdowns)|| 1 ||
|- style="background:#cfc;"
| 2020-02-23 ||Win||align=left| Satanfah Rachanon || Authentic Mix Martial Arts || Phuket, Thailand || KO (Elbow)|| 2 || 
|-
! style=background:white colspan=9 |
|-  style="background:#dadce0;"
| 2019-07-05 || NC ||align=left| Artem Pashporin || Fair Fight IX || Yekaterinburg, Russia || No contest || 3 || 3:00
|-  style="background:#c5d2ea"
| 2019-05-28 || Draw ||align=left| Vuyisile Colossa || MAS Fight|| Hong Kong || Draw|| 1 || 9:00
|-  style="background:#cfc;"
| 2019-03-09|| Win ||align=left| Ruiz Renozo || All Star Fight||Thailand || Decision (Unanimous)|| 3 || 3:00
|-  style="background:#cfc;"
| 2019-01-12|| Win ||align=left|  Artur Temishev || Emei Legend 36 ||China || KO (Left High Knee)|| 1 ||
|- style="background:#cfc;"
| 2018-12-15|| Win ||align=left| Isayants Artur || Emei Legend 35 ||China || Decision (Unanimous)|| 3 || 3:00
|-  style="background:#cfc;"
| 2018-10-13 || Win ||align=left| Long Sevandeun || Topking World Series 23||  China || KO (Right Elbow) || 2 ||
|-  style="background:#cfc;"
| 2018-07-28 || Win ||align=left| Giannis Boukis || Emei Legend 32|| Chengdu China || KO (Punches) ||2 ||
|-  style="background:#cfc;"
| 2018-06-16 || Win ||align=left| Georges Solomon || Topking World Series 21||  Thailand || KO (Right Elbow) || 1 ||
|-  style="background:#cfc;"
| 2018-04-28 || Win ||align=left| Daniel Horrobin || Topking World Series 19 || Mahasarakham, Thailand || KO || 2 ||
|-  style="background:#cfc;"
| 2018-02-10 || Win ||align=left| Pascal Schroth || Topking World Series 17, Tournament Final || China || KO (Right Elbows)|| 2 ||
|-  style="background:#cfc;"
| 2018-02-10 || Win ||align=left|  Gabriel Mazzetti || Topking World Series 17, Tournament Semi Finals || China || Decision   || 3 || 3:00
|-  style="background:#cfc;"
| 2018-01-20 || Win ||align=left|  Yassin Baitar|| EM Legend 27 || China || Decision (Unanimous)  || 3 || 3:00
|-  style="background:#cfc;"
| 2017-12-02 || Win ||align=left| Umar Semata || EM Legend 26 || Leshan, China || TKO || 3 || 
|-
|-  style="background:#cfc;"
| 2017-11-18 || Win ||align=left| Patrik Hahn || EM Legend 25 || Macau, China || KO (Right Cross)  || 2 || 
|-
|-  style="background:#cfc;"
| 2017-10-15 || Win ||align=left| Mihran Yenokyan || EM Legend 24 || China || TKO ||  || 
|-
|-  style="background:#cfc;"
| 2017-09-30 || Win ||align=left| Khambakhadov Saifullah || Top King World Series  16 || China || TKO (Referee Stoppage/Cut)|| 1 || 
|-
|-  style="background:#cfc;"
| 2017-08-05 || Win ||align=left| Kazbek Kabulov || Top King World Series  15 || Su-ngai Kolok, Thailand || TKO || 3 || 
|-
|-  style="background:#cfc;"
| 2017-08-05 || Win ||align=left| Damon Goodwin || Top King World Series  15 || Su-ngai Kolok, Thailand || TKO || 1 || 
|-
|-  style="background:#cfc;"
| 2017-07-09 || Win ||align=left| Magnus Andersson || Top King World Series  14 || Chongqing, China || KO || 1 || 
|-
|-  style="background:#cfc;"
| 2017-06-17 || Win ||align=left| Pascal Schroth || EM Legend 20 || Emei-Shan, China || Decision || 3 || 3:00
|-
|-  style="background:#cfc;"
| 2017-05-27 || Win ||align=left| Dzmitry Filipau || Top King World Series  13 || Wuhan, China || KO || 1 || 
|-
|-  style="background:#cfc;"
| 2017-03-18 || Win ||align=left| Azize Hlali || La Nuit Des Titans 2017 || Tours, France || Decision || 5 || 3:00
|-
|-  style="background:#cfc;"
| 2017-01-14 || Win ||align=left| Arbi Emiev || Top King World Series 12 Final || Hohhot, China || Decision || 3 || 3:00
|-
! style=background:white colspan=9 | 
|-
|-  style="background:#cfc;"
| 2017-01-14 || Win ||align=left| Ruslan Ataev || Top King World Series 12 Semi Final || Hohhot, China || KO (Right cross) || 2 || 
|-
|-  style="background:#cfc;"
| 2016-11-27 || Win ||align=left| Sorgraw Petchyindee || Top King World Series 11 Quarter Final|| Nanchang, China || Decision (Unanimous) || 3 || 3:00
|-
|-  style="background:#cfc;"
| 2016-08-27 || Win ||align=left| Dmitry Varats || Top King World Series 10 || Yantai, China  || Decision || 3 || 3:00
|-
|-  style="background:#cfc;"
| 2016-07-10 || Win ||align=left| Brad Stanton || Top King World Series 9 || Luoyang, China || Decision || 5 || 3:00
|-
|-  style="background:#cfc;"
| 2016-06-11 || Win ||align=left| Jimmy Vienot || Warriors Night 5 || Paris, France || Decision || 5 || 3:00
|-
|-  bgcolor="#FFBBBB"
| 2016-04-29|| Loss ||align=left| Littewada Sitthikul || Ruamphonkhonpadriew Fights, Lumpini Stadium || Bangkok, Thailand || Decision || 5 || 3:00
|-
! style=background:white colspan=9 | 
|-
|-  style="background:#cfc;"
| 2016-03-29|| Win ||align=left| Manasak Sor.Jor.Lekmuangnon|| Lumpini Stadium, Kiatpetch Promotion || Bangkok, Thailand || Decision || 5 || 3:00
|-
|-  style="background:#cfc;"
| 2016-03-05|| Win ||align=left| Zhao Yan|| Wu Lin Feng World Championship 2016 || Zhengzhou, China || Decision || 3 || 3:00
|-
|-  style="background:#cfc;"
| 2015-12-13|| Win ||align=left| Bobo Sacko|| Best of Siam || Paris, France || Decision || 5 || 3:00
|-
|-  bgcolor="#FFBBBB"
| 2015-11-10|| Loss ||align=left| Littewada Sitthikul|| Petkiatpet Fights, Lumpini Stadium || Bangkok, Thailand || Decision || 5 || 3:00
|-
|-  style="background:#cfc;"
| 2015-10-05 || Win ||align=left| Saensatharn P.K. Saenchai Muaythaigym || Rajadamnern Stadium || Bangkok, Thailand || Decision || 5 || 3:00
|-  style="background:#cfc;"
| 2015-08-04 || Win ||align=left| Jimmy Vienot || Fight Night Saint-Tropez  || Saint Tropez, France || Decision || 5 || 3:00
|-
|-  bgcolor="#FFBBBB"
| 2015-06-30|| Loss ||align=left| Saensatharn P.K. Saenchai Muaythaigym|| Lumpini Stadium || Bangkok, Thailand || Decision || 5 || 3:00
|-
|-  style="background:#cfc;"
| 2015-01-26 || Win ||align=left| Singdam Kiatmuu9 || Rajadamnern Stadium || Bangkok, Thailand || Decision || 5 || 3:00
|-
|-  style="background:#cfc;"
| 2014-12-24 || Win ||align=left| Saensatharn P.K. Saenchai Muaythaigym || Rajadamnern Stadium || Bangkok, Thailand || Decision || 5 || 3:00
|-
|-  style="background:#cfc;"
| 2014-10-09 || Win ||align=left| Petchboonchu FA Group || Rajadamnern Stadium || Bangkok, Thailand || Decision || 5 || 3:00
|-
|-  style="background:#cfc;"
| 2014-09-10 || Win ||align=left| Petchboonchu FA Group || Rajadamnern Stadium || Bangkok, Thailand || Decision || 5 || 3:00
|-
|-  bgcolor="#FFBBBB"
| 2014-06-11 || Loss ||align=left| Petchboonchu FA Group || Rajadamnern Stadium || Bangkok, Thailand || Decision || 5 || 3:00
|-
! style=background:white colspan=9 | 
|-
|-  bgcolor="#c5d2ea"
| 2014-05-08 || Draw ||align=left| Petchboonchu FA Group || Rajadamnern Stadium || Bangkok, Thailand || Draw|| 5 || 3:00
|-
|-  bgcolor="#FFBBBB"
| 2014-02-28 || Loss ||align=left| Petchboonchu FA Group || Lumpini Stadium || Bangkok, Thailand || Decision || 5 || 3:00
|-
! style=background:white colspan=9 | 
|-
|-  style="background:#cfc;"
| 2014-01-07 || Win ||align=left| Chamuaktong Sor.Yupinda || Lumpinee Stadium || Bangkok, Thailand || Decision || 5 || 3:00
|-
! style=background:white colspan=9 | 
|-
|-  style="background:#cfc;"
| 2013-09-06 || Win ||align=left| Wanchalerm Aooddonmuang || Lumpinee Stadium || Bangkok, Thailand || Decision || 5 || 3:00
|-
|-  style="background:#cfc;"
| 2013-08-08 || Win||align=left| Singdam Kiatmoo9 || Rajadamnern Stadium || Bangkok, Thailand || Decision|| 5||  3:00
|-
|-  style="background:#cfc;"
| 2013-07-16 || Win ||align=left| Wanchalerm Aooddonmuang || Lumpinee Stadium || Bangkok, Thailand || Decision || 5 || 3:00
|-
|-  style="background:#cfc;"
| 2013-05-10 || Win ||align=left| Saenchai PKSaenchaimuaythaigym || Lumpinee Stadium || Bangkok, Thailand || Decision || 5 || 3:00
|-
|-  style="background:#cfc;"
| 2013-04-09 || Win ||align=left| Petchboonchu FA Group || Lumpinee Stadium || Bangkok, Thailand || Decision || 5 || 3:00
|-
! style=background:white colspan=9 | 
|-
|-  style="background:#cfc;"
| 2013-02-07 || Win ||align=left| Singdam Kiatmuu9 || Lumpinee Stadium || Bangkok, Thailand || Decision || 5 || 3:00
|-
|-  style="background:#cfc;"
| 2013-01-04 || Win ||align=left| Petchboonchu FA Group || Lumpinee Stadium || Bangkok, Thailand || Decision || 5 || 3:00
|-
|-  style="background:#cfc;"
| 2012-12-07 || Win ||align=left| Nong-O Kaiyanghadaogym || Lumpinee Stadium || Bangkok, Thailand || Decision || 5 || 3:00
|-
|-  style="background:#cfc;"
| 2012-11-09 || Win ||align=left| Kongsak sitboonmee || Lumpinee Stadium || Bangkok, Thailand || Decision || 5 || 3:00
|-
! style=background:white colspan=9 | 
|-
|-  bgcolor="#FFBBBB"
| 2012-10-11 || Loss ||align=left| Kongsak sitboonmee || Rajadamnern Stadium || Bangkok, Thailand || Decision || 5 || 3:00
|-
|-  bgcolor="#c5d2ea"
| 2012-09-12 || Draw ||align=left| Pakon Sakyothin || Rajadamnern Stadium || Bangkok, Thailand || Draw|| 5 || 3:00
|-
|-  style="background:#cfc;"
| 2012-07-24 || Win ||align=left| Senkeng Jor.Noparath || Lumpinee Stadium || Bangkok, Thailand || Decision || 5 || 3:00
|-
|-  bgcolor="#c5d2ea"
| 2012-06-26 || Draw ||align=left| Singtongnoi Por.Telakun || Lumpinee Stadium || Bangkok, Thailand || Draw|| 5 || 3:00
|-
|-  bgcolor="#FFBBBB"
| 2012-05-17 || Loss ||align=left| Saeksan Or. Kwanmuang || Sor.Sommai Fight, Rajadamnern Stadium || Bangkok, Thailand || Decision || 5 || 3:00
|-
|-  style="background:#cfc;"
| 2012-02-28 || Win ||align=left| Pettawee Sor Kittichai || Lumpinee Stadium || Bangkok, Thailand || Decision || 5 || 3:00
|-
! style=background:white colspan=9 | 
|-
|-  style="background:#cfc;"
| 2012-01-26 || Win ||align=left| Luknimit Singklongsi || Rajadamnern Stadium || Bangkok, Thailand || Decision || 5 || 3:00
|-
|-  style="background:#cfc;"
| 2011-12-06 || Win ||align=left| Yodtongthai Por.Telakoon || Lumpinee Stadium || Bangkok, Thailand || KO (Elbow) || 4 ||
|-
|-  style="background:#cfc;"
| 2011-10-28 || Win ||align=left| Nongbeer Chokngarmwong || Lumpinee Stadium || Bangkok, Thailand || Decision || 5 || 3:00
|-
|-  style="background:#cfc;"
| 2011-09-20 || Win ||align=left| Chatchainoi Gardenseaview || Lumpinee Stadium || Bangkok, Thailand || KO (Elbow) || 3 ||
|-
|-  style="background:#cfc;"
| 2011-08-30 || Win ||align=left| Ekmongkon Kaiyanghadaogym || Lumpinee Stadium || Bangkok, Thailand || Decision || 5 || 3:00
|-
|-  bgcolor="#FFBBBB"
| 2011-07-26 || Loss ||align=left| Thongchai Sitsongpeenong || Lumpinee Stadium || Bangkok, Thailand || Decision || 5 || 3:00
|-
|-  style="background:#cfc;"
| 2011-07-05 || Win ||align=left| Wanchailek Kiatphukam || Lumpinee Stadium || Bangkok, Thailand || Decision || 5 || 3:00
|-
|-  bgcolor="#FFBBBB"
| 2011-05-28 || Loss ||align=left| Wanchailek Kiatphukam || Omnoi Stadium || Bangkok, Thailand || Decision || 5 || 3:00
|-
|-  style="background:#cfc;"
| 2011-04-08 || Win ||align=left| Orono Sor.Darnchai || Lumpinee Stadium || Bangkok, Thailand || Decision || 5 || 3:00
|-
|-  style="background:#cfc;"
| 2011-03-15 || Win ||align=left| Pompean Kiatchongkao || Lumpinee Stadium || Bangkok, Thailand || Decision || 5 || 3:00
|-
|-  style="background:#cfc;"
| 2011-01-28 || Win ||align=left| Fonluang Sitboonmee || Lumpinee Stadium || Bangkok, Thailand || Decision || 5 || 3:00
|-
|-  style="background:#cfc;"
| 2010-12-24 || Win ||align=left| Fonluang Sitboonmee || Lumpinee Stadium || Bangkok, Thailand || Decision || 5 || 3:00
|-
|-  style="background:#cfc;"
| 2010-11-23 || Win ||align=left| Yodkhunpon Sitmonchai || Lumpinee Stadium || Bangkok, Thailand || Decision || 5 || 3:00
|-
|-  style="background:#cfc;"
| 2010-09-17 || Win ||align=left| Ponmongkol KT Gym || Lumpinee Stadium || Bangkok, Thailand || Decision || 5 || 3:00
|-
|-  style="background:#cfc;"
| 2010-08-24 || Win ||align=left| Thongchai Sitsongpeenong || Lumpinee Stadium || Bangkok, Thailand || Decision || 5 || 3:00
|-
|-  bgcolor="#FFBBBB"
| 2010-07-21 || Loss ||align=left| Newwangjan Sor.Katika || Rajadamnern Stadium || Bangkok, Thailand || Decision || 5 || 3:00
|-
|-  bgcolor="#FFBBBB"
| 2010-03-02 || Loss ||align=left| Newwungjan Sor.Katika || Lumpinee Stadium || Bangkok, Thailand || Decision || 5 || 3:00
|-
|-  style="background:#cfc;"
| 2010-02-06 || Win ||align=left| Newwungjan Sor.Katika || Omnoi Stadium || Bangkok, Thailand || Decision || 5 || 3:00
|-
| colspan=9 | Legend:    
|-

Amateur Muay Thai record

|-  bgcolor="#CCFFCC"
| 2018-05-19 || Win ||align=left| Andrei Kulebin || I.F.M.A. World Muaythai Championships 2018, Finals -71 kg || Cancun, Mexico || Decision || 3 || 3:00
|-
! style=background:white colspan=9 | 
|-
|-  bgcolor="#CCFFCC"
| 2018-05-16 || Win ||align=left| Yildirim Oguz || I.F.M.A. World Muaythai Championships 2018, Semi Finals -71 kg || Cancun, Mexico || Decision || 3 || 3:00
|-  bgcolor="#CCFFCC"
| 2018-05-14 || Win ||align=left| Oleh Huta || I.F.M.A. World Muaythai Championships 2018, Quarter Finals -71 kg || Cancun, Mexico || Decision || 3 || 3:00
|-  bgcolor="#CCFFCC"
| 2018-03-13 || Win ||align=left| Muensang Suppachai || Army Games 68 || Thailand || Decision || 3 || 3:00
|-
! style=background:white colspan=9 | 
|-
| colspan=9 | Legend:

References 

Yodwicha Por Boonsit
Welterweight kickboxers
1996 births
Living people
Yodwicha Por Boonsit